In enzymology, a T2-induced deoxynucleotide kinase is an enzyme that catalyzes the chemical reaction

ATP + dGMP (or dTMP)  ADP + dGDP (or dTDP)

The 3 substrates of this enzyme are ATP, dGMP, and dTMP, whereas its 3 products are ADP, dGDP, and dTDP.

This enzyme belongs to the family of transferases, specifically those transferring phosphorus-containing groups (phosphotransferases) with a phosphate group as acceptor.  The systematic name of this enzyme class is ATP:(d)NMP phosphotransferase.

References

 

EC 2.7.4
Enzymes of unknown structure